The 1999–2000 Tampa Bay Lightning season was the Lightning's eighth season of operation. The club placed fourteenth overall in the Eastern Conference and failed to make the playoffs for the fourth consecutive year.

Offseason

Regular season
March 4, 2000: In a victory over the Tampa Bay Lightning, Patrick Roy earned the 435th victory of his career.

Final standings

Game log

Player stats

Awards and records

Transactions

Draft picks
Tampa Bay's draft picks at the 1999 NHL Entry Draft held at the FleetCenter in Boston, Massachusetts.

See also
1999–2000 NHL season

References
 

Tam
Tam
Tampa Bay Lightning seasons
Tamp
Tamp